Metadrosus bellus is a species of true weevils (insects in the family Curculionidae). It is found in Southern Europe.

References

External links 

 Metadrosus bellus at insectoid.info
 Metadrosus bellus at the Catalogue of Life

Beetles described in 1859
Entiminae